Antoni Stutz is a Swiss/German filmmaker and artist.

Stutz is known for the neo-noir thriller Rushlights (2013), which he directed and produced. Starring Beau Bridges, Aidan Quinn, Josh Henderson and Haley Webb, Rushlights was included in the official selections of the Montreal World Film Festival, the Shanghai International Film Festival, the Dallas International Film Festival as well as the Newport Beach Film Festival. An extended directors cut of Rushlights was released in 2016.

In 1997, he directed his first feature film the comedy/thriller, You're Killing Me (2003) starring Julie Bowen (Modern Family).

Stutz later served as Executive Producer alongside Fred Roos and Jeffrey Coulter on the feature film Expired (2007) directed by Cecilia Miniucchi. Starring Jason Patric and Samantha Morton, the film was included in the official selection of the Sundance Film Festival and the Cannes Film Festival. Patric won Best Actor for the film at the Stockholm International Film Festival.

Stutz is currently developing his next feature film, a psychological thriller.

Born and raised in Germany to Swiss parents, Stutz's father Hans-Joachim Stutz was an architect and an executive director of HPP (1974-2000) one of the most prolific and best-known architectural firms in Germany.

Stutz graduated from college in Germany with an emphasis on Fine Arts. He continued his education in the United States at the Lee Strasberg Theatre Institute, both in Los Angeles and New York, under the direction of Anna Strasberg. At the same time he immersed himself in film studies at UCLA.

Stutz began his career as an actor in his teens. Early television roles included Tour of Duty and Michael Mann's Crime Story.

His first feature film role was in John Frankenheimer's Dead Bang co-starring Don Johnson, Penelope Ann Miller and William Forsythe.

Stutz worked as a freelance director on commercials and music videos including MTV’s iconic “ROCK THE VOTE” campaign.

Stutz has exhibited his paintings, photography and multi-textural installations both nationally and internationally in museums and galleries. His first solo art show was in 2005 at Bergamot Station followed by an exhibit in 2006 at the Riverside Art Museum, curated by American art critic Peter Frank. In 2014, Stutz's work was presented at the Irvine Fine Arts Center followed by a show in 2016 at BerlinArtProjects Gallery in Berlin, Germany.

HIs latest work, which Peter Frank described as "Sculptural Pop-Cubism," was presented at the Palace of Fine Arts in San Francisco at the 2018 inaugural If So, What international art fair.

In 2019 Stutz presented a large multi-textural artwork installation at DENK Gallery in Downtown Los Angeles in the UltraChrome Plus exhibit July 20 - September 7, 2019. His latest show on February 22 – April 11, 2020 also at DENK entitled “''Heavy Metal''” was an introduction of Stutz’ passion for abstract, modern sculpture. Stutz exhibited alongside artists such as Tim Hawkinson.

References

Year of birth missing (living people)
Living people
21st-century German photographers
Swiss photographers
German film directors
Swiss film directors
20th-century German painters
20th-century German male artists
Swiss painters
21st-century German painters
21st-century German male artists
German film producers
Swiss film producers